The painted schinia moth (Schinia volupia) is a moth of the family Noctuidae. It is found in North America, including Arizona, New Mexico, Kansas, Colorado, Nebraska, Oklahoma and Texas.

The wingspan is 20–22 mm.

The larvae feed on Gaillardia pulchella.

External links
Images
Bug Guide
Butterflies and Moths of North America

Schinia
Moths of North America
Moths described in 1868